The Black Racer is a fictional character, a deity and avatar of Death in the DC Comics universe who often hunts those affiliated with the Speed Force. The character first appears in New Gods #3 (July 1971) and was created by Jack Kirby.

Fictional character biography
The Black Racer's corporeal form is that of the otherwise bedridden Sgt. Willie Walker, who was paralyzed during the Vietnam War. Walker was contacted by the Source when Darkseid first brought the war of the gods to Earth, and told it was his responsibility to take on the role.
The Racer makes use of what appear to be skis as his means of transport, much like how the Silver Surfer, another Kirby creation, uses a surfboard. New Gods are collected by the Racer at the moment of their deaths, and taken to Hadis (the Fourth World version of Hades).

According to Captain Atom #42, the Black Racer represents "death as inevitability", whereas Death of the Endless represents "death as compassionate release". Nekron, meanwhile, represents "Death as the Ultimate Opponent". This has been contested by Neil Gaiman, who says that Death of the Endless is the ultimate incarnation of death in the DC Universe.

During the Our Worlds at War crossover, he came to harvest Steel's soul, but Superman talked him out of it. Young Justice came across him while he was moving Steel to Apokolips and pursued him by initiative of Lobo and Superboy, even if Robin disagreed. In the Darkseid Vs. Galactus crossover, Silver Surfer was able to delay the Racer when it came to claim Orion, giving Orion's Mother Box time to heal his injuries.

Seven Soldiers
In Grant Morrison's miniseries Seven Soldiers: Mister Miracle, the Black Racer appears as a wheelchair user (probably not Willie Walker, as he appears white), following the destruction of Apokolips and New Genesis. He has a bet with Metron as to whether Mister Miracle will be successful in saving the New Gods. The Racer's original form makes brief appearances to test Shilo Norman's skills.

Death of the New Gods
Willie Walker was killed in the first issue of the eight-part Death of the New Gods mini-series. He was killed by Infinity-Man, who tore his heart out. Serifan of the Forever People was seen exiting the room after his death.

Final Crisis

The Black Racer makes an appearance in #1, present at the death of Orion. As with the other New Gods, his appearance has been redesigned; he now wears a sleeker armor only faintly resembling his classic appearance (his skis now appear to be highly stylized boots), and his poles appear much like scythes. The Final Crisis Sketchbook states that J.G. Jones and Grant Morrison decided to play up the Black Knight aspect of the character in this new design.

The Black Racer also appears at the end of #2, pursuing Barry Allen/The Flash and the God-bullet that has been fired backwards through time. In issue #6, Wally West suggests that the Black Racer and the Black Flash are one and the same; in The Flash: Rebirth #2 this idea is mentioned once again. In issue #7, Barry and Wally West, chased by the Black Racer, bring him to a mortally wounded Darkseid, whom he decides to take in their place.

The New 52
The Black Racer makes his first appearance after the Flashpoint reboot in the Darkseid War storyline set in The New 52. When his master went to war against the Anti-God, he was summoned to destroy Darkseid's enemy, but the latter stripped the Racer of Darkseid's grasp and merged it with a being of speed as the weapon to deliver a deathly blow against the Dark God, finally killing the despot of Apokolips.
The Racer was quick to seize control of his new host's mind, but his efforts were almost negated by the Flash's will to resist his corrupting ideals, instigating a conflict among the two.
The Black Racer was separated from The Flash by the powers of the child of Superwoman and Alexander Luthor, who possessed the same ability to absorb the super powers of others as his father. However, the Racer could not be absorbed, and instead was only separated from its host. As it needed to claim a life before it could disappear, it struck Power Ring; Jessica Cruz was spared and instead the life of Volthoom was claimed, and his ring destroyed. The Racer then vanished.

Powers and abilities
The Black Racer has the power to phase through solid objects and bring death to those he has chosen with a single touch. He travels through the air by means of two cosmically powered celestial skis, which can accelerate to the speed of light. His ski poles can also phase through solid matter to deliver the Black Racer's deathstroke. As a deity, he's also immortal, and wears a cosmic armor that give him super strength and endurance. When he has finished delivering his message of death, the Black Racer returns to the comatose life of Sgt. Willie Walker until he is summoned anew.

Other versions

Rock of Ages
The Black Racer is shown in an alternate future in the JLA story arc "Rock of Ages", although little seems changed about him in this alternate timeline.

Darkseid/Galactus: The Hunger
During the Marvel/DC intercompany crossover Darkseid vs. Galactus: The Hunger, when Orion is badly injured in a fight with the Silver Surfer – during a period when the Surfer still served as Galactus's Herald – the Black Racer briefly comes to claim Orion, but the Surfer, his original memories briefly restored by Desaad as part of a plan to stop Galactus, confronts the Racer in recognition of Orion's nobility, giving Orion's Mother Box enough time to heal the rest of his injuries.

Earth-22 (Kingdom Come)
On Mark Waid's and Alex Ross' Elseworlds comic Kingdom Come, the Black Racer takes no significant part on the story save a minuscule panel during the Battle of the Gulag on issue #4 just behind Blue Beetle; the panel comes seconds before Captain Marvel prematurely detonates a nuclear device sent by the United Nations to end the metahuman conflict. The Black Racer's presence signifies the impending massive deaths caused by the explosion, though the action of the Green Lanterns and Fate save a lucky few.

DCeased
Black Racer features in the first issue of the mini-series DCeased, written by Tom Taylor. When Darkseid calls Black Racer to take a part of him (death) to create the coveted Anti-Life equation, he accidentally corrupts the equation. Later, under the influence of the new equation, he kills the Black Racer.

In other media

Television
Black Racer makes a non-speaking cameo appearance in the Superman: The Animated Series episode "Apokolips... Now! Part II".

Miscellaneous
 The name "Black Racer" is used as an alternative alias for Smallville Season 11s incarnation of the Black Flash.
 Black Racer appears in the Injustice: Gods Among Us prequel comic as one of Darkseid's prisoners.

References
  Content in this article was copied from Black Racer (Prime Earth) at the DC Database wiki, which is licensed under the Creative Commons Attribution-Share Alike 3.0 (Unported) (CC-BY-SA 3.0) license.

External links
 World of Black Heroes: Black Racer Biography
 DCU Guide: Black Racer

Fourth World (comics)
Fictional military sergeants
Fictional Vietnam War veterans
Fictional personifications of death
Fictional characters with immortality
Fictional characters with death or rebirth abilities
Fictional characters who can manipulate time
Fictional characters with dimensional travel abilities
Fictional characters with electric or magnetic abilities
Fictional characters who can manipulate sound
Fictional characters who can turn invisible
Fictional characters who can turn intangible
Fictional characters with air or wind abilities
Fictional characters with absorption or parasitic abilities
Fictional characters with elemental transmutation abilities
Fictional characters with density control abilities
Fictional characters with energy-manipulation abilities
Comics characters introduced in 1971
Characters created by Jack Kirby
DC Comics deities 
DC Comics characters who can move at superhuman speeds
DC Comics characters with superhuman senses
DC Comics characters with superhuman strength
DC Comics military personnel
Time travelers